The Old Royal Palace ( Palaiá Anáktora) is the first royal palace of modern Greece, completed in 1843. It has housed the Hellenic Parliament since 1934. The Old Palace is situated at the heart of modern Athens, facing onto Syntagma Square.

History 
The palace was designed by Bavarian architect Friedrich von Gärtner for King Otto of Greece, with funds donated by Otto's father, King Ludwig I of Bavaria. Previous proposals had placed the new palace at the sites of Omonoia Square, Kerameikos and even on top the Acropolis of Athens. Construction work started in 1836 and was completed in 1843.

After suffering fire damage in 1909, it entered a long period of renovation. During renovations the King and his family moved to the Crown Prince's Palace, from then on known as the "New Palace", one block to the east on Herodou Attikou Street.

Some of the royal family, chiefly the dowager Queen Olga, continued to reside in the "Old Palace" until 1922. In 1924, a referendum abolished the monarchy. The building was then used for many different purposes—housing a variety of government and public services in the 1920s, functioning as a makeshift hospital during World War II, a refugee shelter for Greek refugees from Asia Minor in 1922, a museum with the personal effects of King George I (now part of the collection of the National Historical Museum), and other uses.

In November 1929 the government decided that the building would permanently house Parliament (previously housed in what is now called the Old Parliament House). After more extensive renovations, the Senate convened in the "Old Palace" on 2 August 1934, followed by the Fifth National Assembly on 1 July 1935. Although the monarchy was restored that same year, the building has housed Parliament ever since.

Bibliography

References

External links

Official website of the Hellenic Parliament
History of the Hellenic Parliament Building

Landmarks in Athens
Neoclassical palaces
1843 establishments in Greece
Buildings and structures completed in 1843
Greece
Greece
Government buildings in Athens
Hellenic Parliament
Neoclassical architecture in Greece
Royal residences in Greece
Palaces in Greece